The FIFA Youth Tournament Under-18 1952 Final Tournament was held in Spain.

Teams
The following teams entered the tournament:

 
 
 
 
  (host)

First round
For this round  and  received a Bye.

Semifinals

Fifth-place match

Third place match

Final

External links
Results by RSSSF

1950
1952
1951–52 in European football
1951–52 in Spanish football
1951–52 in English football
1951–52 in French football
1951–52 in Austrian football
1951–52 in Belgian football
1951–52 in Swiss football
1950s in Barcelona
Football in Barcelona
1952 in youth association football
1952 in Catalonia